Rickey Minor and The Tonight Show Band was the house band of The Tonight Show with Jay Leno from 2010 until 2014. Minor took over The Tonight Show Band after Kevin Eubanks and his band left the show on May 28, 2010 after spending 18 years with Leno and disbanded when Leno's Tonight Show tenure ended in 2014.

Members
 Leader/Bass: Rickey Minor
 Saxophone: Randolph Ellis, Miguel Gandelman
 Trumpet: Raymond Monteiro
 Trombone: Garrett Smith
 Keyboard: J. Wayne Linsey, David Delhomme
 Guitar: Paul Jackson, Jr.
 Drums: Teddy Campbell 
 Percussion: Kevin Ricard
 Vocals: Dorian Holley

The Tonight Show Band members
American jazz ensembles from California
Radio and television house bands